Chartchai Chionoi a.k.a. Chartchai Laemfapha or birth name Naris Chionoi (October 10, 1942 – January 21, 2018) was a Thai professional boxer, WBC world champion and WBA world champion in the flyweight division. He took the WBC World Flyweight Championship two successive times and the WBA Championship one time before finally relinquishing it.

Early life
He was born into a poor family near Hua Lamphong quarter in Bangkok. Later, he moved with his family to settle down on the Thonburi side close to Wat Mai Phiren temple, where he started boxing for the first time in the event organized by Royal Thai Navy.

Professional career 
Chartchai Chionoi was the second world boxing champion from Thailand, following his Idol Pone Kingpetch. Unlike most Thai fighters, Chartchai was never involved in the Thai combat art Muay Thai.

Chartchai Chionoi turned pro on March 27, 1959 with a second-round knockout over Somsak Kritsanasuwan. He went 7-0-1 in his first eight pro fights, with a six-round draw against Sala Kampuch the only blemish. In his ninth professional fight, he lost a 6-round decision to Singtong Por Tor. He avenged this loss five years later with a 10-round decision against Por Tor.

Chionoi traveled to Japan for his next 11 fights, going 8 and 3 in the process. All three of his losses were by 10-round decisions, including a loss at the hands of the reigning OPBF Jr. Featherweight Champion Haruo Sakamoto. The other two fighters that defeated Chionoi during this time, Mitsunori Seki and Akira Oguchi, lost rematches with him.

After fighting in Japan for a year, Chionoi returned to his native Thailand for his next four fights, his only loss to Ernesto Miranda, whom he later defeated in a rematch.

On September 22, 1962, in Quezon City, Philippines, Chionoi met Primo Famiro for the vacant OPBF Flyweight Championship. Chionoi decisioned Famiro over twelve rounds to capture the vacant title. In July of the following year, Chionoi lost his first defense of the OPBF Flyweight Championship in a decision to Tsuyoshi Nakamura in Osaka, Japan. Nakamura made ten successful defenses of the OPBF Championship, before finally losing it in October 1969.

Chionoi went 19-2-1 over the next three years to earn his first world title shot. During that stretch, he won a 10-round decision over WBA and WBC Flyweight Champion Salvatore Burruni. Burruni had captured his world titles by defeating Chionoi's predecessor, Pone Kingpetch, in April 1965.

On December 30, 1966, Chionoi challenged the World Flyweight Champion Walter McGowan (lineal champion, recognized by EBU, BBBofC and The Ring). He stopped McGowan in the 9th round to capture the vacant WBC Flyweight Title, his first world title. Chionoi made four successful title defenses during this first reign as champion, including victories over McGowan in their rematch, and Efren Torres.

On February 23, 1969, Chionoi lost his title to Efren Torres in a rematch. The fight was stopped in the 8th round because Chionoi's left eye had swollen shut. He won two out of three fights to earn a rematch with Torres.

In March 1970 in front of over 40,000 of his countrymen, Chionoi won a 15-round unanimous decision over Torres in their rubber match, to once again claim the WBC Flyweight Championship. He won by scores of 148-142, 147-144 and 145-141. His second title reign was short lived.

In his first title defense, Chionoi was knocked out by Erbito Salavarria in the second round. Salavarria made several successful title defenses before losing the WBC Flyweight Championship; he later reigned as WBA Flyweight Champion as well.

Undeterred by losing the WBC Flyweight Championship for a second time, Chionoi went undefeated in his next six fights to secure a title shot against long time WBA Flyweight Champion Masao Ohba. On January 2, 1973, Chionoi faced Ohba in a very memorable fight. Chionoi put Ohba on the canvas early, but the champion rebounded and stopped Chionoi in the 12th round.

Ohba died in an auto accident 22 days after this fight. As a result, Chionoi was paired against Fritz Chervet in May 1973 for the vacant title. He knocked out Chervet in the 5th round to capture his third World Flyweight Championship.

Two successful defenses of his WBA Flyweight Championship followed, before Chionoi lost it on the scales in October 1974. Despite being stripped of the title, he still fought Susumu Hanagata in a fight that was for the vacant WBA Flyweight Title, at least on Hanagata's part. Hanagata stopped Chionoi in the 6th round to walk away the WBA Flyweight Champion.

After losing his third World title, Chionoi won a ten-round decision over Willie Asuncion, then lost by knockout to Rodolfo Francis in August 1975. He retired from boxing after this loss, finishing with a career record of 61-18-3 (36).

Retirement 
Chionoi lived a comfortable life in retirement with his wife of over 45 years, spending as much time as possible with their four children. Despite some lasting ill effects from his years as a boxer, he had fond memories of his career, and no regrets.

He had lasting effects from Parkinson's disease, including come paralysis, a by-product of his boxing career.

He died on the evening of January 21, 2018, at 75 years old.

Professional boxing record

See also
List of flyweight boxing champions
List of WBC world champions

References

External links 

 
 Chartchai Chionoi - CBZ Profile

|-

|-

|-

|-

1942 births
2018 deaths
Flyweight boxers
People with Parkinson's disease
Deaths from pneumonia in Thailand
World Boxing Association champions
World Boxing Council champions
World flyweight boxing champions
World boxing champions
Chartchai Chionoi
Chartchai Chionoi
Chartchai Chionoi